Gundenis was a virgin martyr. She suffered martyrdom during the persecutions of Septimius Severus.

Notes

203 deaths
Saints from Roman Africa (province)
3rd-century Christian martyrs
Year of birth unknown